In baseball, the strike zone is the volume of space through which a pitch must pass in order to be called a strike even if the batter does not swing. The strike zone is defined as the volume of space above home plate and between the batter's knees and the midpoint of their torso. Whether a pitch passes through the zone is decided by an umpire, who is generally positioned behind the catcher.

Strikes are desirable for the pitcher and the fielding team, as three strikes result in a strikeout of that batter. A pitch that misses the strike zone is called a ball if the batter doesn't swing. Balls are desirable for the batter and the batting team, as four balls allow the batter to take a "walk" to first base as a base on balls.

Definition
The strike zone is a volume of space, a vertical right pentagonal prism. Its sides are vertical planes extending up from the edges of home plate. In Major League Baseball, the top of the strike zone is the midpoint between the top of the batter's shoulders and the top of the uniform pants, and the bottom of the strike zone is at the hollow beneath the kneecap, both determined from the batter's stance as the batter is prepared to swing at the pitched ball. Various rulebooks for baseball and softball define the strike zone slightly differently.

(A pitch is also a strike if the batter swings or offers the bat in an attempt to hit the pitch. A pitch batted into foul territory—a foul ball—is also a strike, subject to various exceptions.) A pitch that is not a strike is called a ball (short for "no ball"). The active tally of strikes and balls during a player's turn at bat is called the count.

Although the de facto enforced strike zone can vary, the Official Rules (Definitions of Terms, STRIKE (b)) define a pitch as a strike "if any part of the ball passes through any part of the strike zone", with the ball required to have not bounced. Thus, a pitch that touches the outer boundary of the zone is as much a strike as a pitch that is thrown right down the center. A pitch passing outside the front of the strike zone but curving so as to enter this volume farther back (without being hit) is called a "back-door strike".

A batter who accumulates three strikes in a single batting appearance has struck out and is ruled out (with the exception of an uncaught third strike); a batter who accumulates four balls in a single appearance has drawn a base on balls (or walk) and is awarded advancement to first base. In very early iterations of the rules during the 19th century, it took up to 9 balls for a batter to earn a walk; however, to make up for this, the batter could request the ball to be pitched high, low, or medium.

History
Originally, the word "strike" was used literally: the batter striking at the ball in an effort to hit it. For example, the 11th of the Knickerbocker Rules (1845) read "Three balls being struck at and missed and the last one caught, is a hand-out." There was no adverse consequence if the batter chose not to swing, i.e. the called strike did not exist, the result being batters prepared to wait all day for "their" pitch.  It was not until the 1858 NABBP convention that a rule was adopted authorizing the umpire to impose a penalty strike for such conduct: "Should a striker stand at the bat without striking at good balls repeatedly pitched to him, for the purpose of delaying the game or of giving advantage to a player, the umpire, after warning him, shall call one strike, and if he persists in such action, two and three strikes. When three strikes are called, he shall be subject to the same rules as if he had struck at three balls."  The called ball first appeared in the rules of 1863, similarly as a discretionary penalty imposed on the pitcher for persistently delivering "unfair" balls. 

Whether or not a pitch was "unfair," or the batter was being unreasonably picky, was a matter left entirely to the umpire's judgment; well into the 1870s umpires were reluctant to make such calls, since they were viewed as penalties for unsportsmanlike play. But by the 1880s they had become routine, and the modern view according to which every pitch results in either a swing, a ball or a called strike had taken hold.  The first rule leading to the creation of a defined strike zone was enacted by the American Association before the 1886 season.  As explained in The Sporting Life on March 17, 1886, "the ball must be delivered at the height called for by the batsman. If at such height it passes over any part of the plate then it is a strike. The idea is to give the pitcher a chance against some cranky umpires who compelled the twirlers to almost cut the plate in two before a strike would be called, even if the height was right." The following year, the National League created the full strike zone, eliminating the batter's right to call the height of the pitch, and instead requiring the umpire to call a strike on any pitch that "passes over home plate not lower than the batsman's knee, nor higher than his shoulders."

Major League Baseball has occasionally increased or reduced the size of the strike zone in an attempt to control the balance of power between pitchers and hitters. In , pitchers such as Denny McLain and Bob Gibson among others dominated hitters, producing 339 shutouts. Carl Yastrzemski would be the only American League hitter to finish the season with a batting average higher than .300. In the National League, Gibson posted a 1.12 earned run average, the lowest in 54 years, while Los Angeles Dodgers pitcher Don Drysdale threw a record 58 and two-thirds consecutive scoreless innings during the 1968 season. As a result of the dropping offensive statistics, Major League Baseball took steps to reduce the advantage held by pitchers by lowering the height of the pitcher's mound from 15 inches to 10 inches, and by reducing the size of the strike zone for the  season.

Enforcement
While baseball rules provide a precise definition for the strike zone, in practice, it is up to the judgment of the umpire to decide whether the pitch passed through the zone.

The Official Baseball Rules (Rule 8.02(a), including Comment) state that objections to judgment calls on the field, including balls and strikes, shall not be tolerated, and that any manager, coach, or player who leaves his dugout or field position to contest a judgment call will first be warned, and then ejected.

Many umpires, players and analysts, including the authors of a University of Nebraska study on the subject, believe that due to the QuesTec pitch-tracking system, the enforced strike zone in 2002–2006 was larger compared to the zone in 1996–2000 and thus closer to the rulebook definition.  Some commentators believed that the zone had changed so much that some pitchers, such as Tom Glavine, had to radically adjust their approach to pitching for strikes. In 2003, a frustrated Curt Schilling took a baseball bat to a QuesTec camera and destroyed it after a loss, saying the umpires shouldn't be changing the strike zone to match the machines.

In 2009, a new system called Zone Evaluation was implemented in all 30 Major League ballparks, replacing the QuesTec system; the new system records the ball's position in flight more than 20 times before it reaches home plate. Much of the early resistance from Major League umpires to QuesTec had diminished and the implementation of the new Zone Evaluation system in all the parks went largely unmentioned to fans. Like the old system, the new system will be used to grade umpires on accuracy and used to determine which umpires receive postseason assignments, but games themselves are still subject to their error.

As of 2022, Minor league baseball had used Automated Balls and Strikes on an experimental basis for several seasons. While the umpire continued to call balls and strikes, an automated system determined the strike zone and could be used when a team challenged the umpire's call. Major League Baseball commissioner Rob Manfred said in October 2022 that this method would eventually be used in Major League games. ESPN reported that all AAA games would use the method in the 2023 season.

In other sports
In cricket, a ball is effectively a strike if it knocks over the wicket. A single strike retires the batter. The closest equivalent to a ball is the wide, which is an automatic 1-run penalty for any pitch out of reach of the batter and/or wicket.

See also

Glossary of baseball

References

Further reading

External links
2001 Changes in Strike Zone St. Petersburg Times article.
Strike Zone MLB website.
John Walsh, "Strike Zone: Fact vs. Fiction", The Hardball Times, July 11, 2007
The Strike Zone: A Chronological Examination of the Official Rules baseball-almanac

Batting (baseball)
Baseball pitching
Baseball terminology
Baseball rules